Bindian is a small village in Kotli District of Pakistani Kashmir.

Geography 
Bindian lies 20 miles from the town of Kotli in the heart of the Bannah Valley of Khuiratta, which can also be pronounced Khoiratta.

Demographics 
Most of the people are farmers, working abroad and in Military.

Education 
Bindian has always been a hub for Political and religious activities in Banah Valley, there are many well-qualified teachers, professors, librarians and military and air force employees. Notables are Qazi Family from Bindian who excelled in every field and brought laurels to the community. Few names are Colonel Qazi Muhammad Jan SJ, whose bravery and role model is a name people look up to. There are other important figures of the village like Ghazi Abdul Rehman, master Alif Din, Master Siddique, Qazi Khaleel, Qazi Abdul Rehman, Col Qazi Farooq and Major Qazi Iftikhar. People in village usually live in houses made of bricks, clay or mud. These typically have two or three rooms which house extended families. Although now they prefer living by making separate home for each family (nuclear units) but they don't live far away from their relatives, and they are extending their villages by making more homes. Due to geographical and other socioeconomic diversity, different regions have slightly different physical and social layout. The village is also known for its wheat and corn which is still grown organically. 

Bindian has two schools, a boys high school (Colonel Qazi Jan high School) and a girls school that children attend from age 4.

Notables 

 Colonel Qazi Muhammad Jan SJ
 Master Allaf Deen
 Qazi Mohammed Khalil Qureshi
 Ghazi Abdur Rehman
 Colonel Qazi Muhammad Farooq
 Haji Raj Mohammad
 Master Abdul Kareem

Religion 
Bindian is 100% Sunni Muslim population, has a masjid that is located in the middle of the village on the spot known as the taup.

References

External links 

Populated places in Kotli District